The Channels Natural Area Preserve is a  Natural Area Preserve located in Washington and Russell counties, Virginia. It was established in April 2008 to protect a number of significant natural communities and habitats, including high-elevation forests, rock outcrops, and cliffs. Its name comes from a cluster of eroded crevices and sandstone boulders located on a portion of the land.

The preserve is part of the Channels State Forest, managed by the Virginia Department of Forestry. The state forest and preserve are both open to the public, though an access permit is required for some activities on state forest lands.

Images and video

See also
 List of Virginia Natural Area Preserves

References

External links
Virginia Department of Conservation and Recreation: The Channels Natural Area Preserve

Virginia Natural Area Preserves
Protected areas established in 2008
Protected areas of Washington County, Virginia
Protected areas of Russell County, Virginia
Articles containing video clips